Onitis is a genus of Scarabaeidae or scarab beetles in the superfamily Scarabaeoidea and typical of the tribe Onitini.

Species
Species within this genus include:

 Onitis abyssinicus
 Onitis adelphus
 Onitis adriani
 Onitis aeneomicans
 Onitis aeneus
 Onitis aerarius
 Onitis aeruginosus
 Onitis aethiops
 Onitis affinis
 Onitis alexis
 Onitis androcles
 Onitis anthracinus
 Onitis archettii
 Onitis artuosus
 Onitis assamensis
 Onitis autumnalis
 Onitis aygulus
 Onitis bayanga
 Onitis belial
 Onitis bilobatus
 Onitis bispicticollis
 Onitis bocandei
 Onitis bordati
 Onitis brahma
 Onitis bredoi
 Onitis brevidens
 Onitis caffer
 Onitis cambeforti
 Onitis camerunus
 Onitis castaneus
 Onitis cerrutii
 Onitis chalceus
 Onitis confusus
 Onitis corydon
 Onitis coxalis
 Onitis crassus
 Onitis crenatus
 Onitis cribratus
 Onitis cryptodus
 Onitis cupreus
 Onitis curvipes
 Onitis damoetas
 Onitis deceptor
 Onitis denticoxa
 Onitis dimidiatus
 Onitis dispar
 Onitis endroedii
 Onitis excavatus
 Onitis ezechias
 Onitis fabricii
 Onitis falcatus
 Onitis feae
 Onitis fractipes
 Onitis fulgidus
 Onitis fulmineus
 Onitis gazanus
 Onitis gilleti
 Onitis granicollis
 Onitis granulisetosus
 Onitis guineensis
 Onitis hageni
 Onitis humerosus
 Onitis inflaticollis
 Onitis insuetus
 Onitis intermedius
 Onitis inversidens
 Onitis ion
 Onitis janssenii
 Onitis jeanneli
 Onitis jossoi
 Onitis keniensis
 Onitis kingstoni
 Onitis lama
 Onitis laminosus
 Onitis lamnifer
 Onitis lansbergei
 Onitis laticollis
 Onitis licitus
 Onitis lobi
 Onitis lobipes
 Onitis lognia
 Onitis longitibialis
 Onitis ludekingi
 Onitis lycophron
 Onitis malleatus
 Onitis marshalli
 Onitis mendax
 Onitis menieri
 Onitis meruensis
 Onitis meyeri
 Onitis miesseni
 Onitis minutus
 Onitis mniszechi
 Onitis mniszechianus
 Onitis monstrosus
 Onitis mossambicensis
 Onitis multidentatus
 Onitis naviauxi
 Onitis nemoralis
 Onitis niger
 Onitis nigeriensis
 Onitis nubiensis
 Onitis numida
 Onitis obenbergeri
 Onitis obscurus
 Onitis occidentalis
 Onitis orthopus
 Onitis overlaeti
 Onitis paraconfusus
 Onitis parainflaticollis
 Onitis paramniszechi
 Onitis parvulus
 Onitis pecuarius
 Onitis perbrincki
 Onitis perpunctatus
 Onitis pers
 Onitis perturbator
 Onitis phartopus
 Onitis philemon
 Onitis picticollis
 Onitis pinheyi
 Onitis podicinus
 Onitis politus
 Onitis popei
 Onitis proximus
 Onitis pseudojansenii
 Onitis pseudoorthopus
 Onitis pseudosetosus
 Onitis pumilio
 Onitis punctatostriatus
 Onitis pyramus
 Onitis reichei
 Onitis retrodentatus
 Onitis ringenbachi
 Onitis robustus
 Onitis rothi
 Onitis senegalensis
 Onitis setosus
 Onitis shoensis
 Onitis sibutensis
 Onitis similis
 Onitis singhalensis
 Onitis siva
 Onitis sphinx
 Onitis spinicrus
 Onitis spinipes
 Onitis subcrenatus
 Onitis subopacus
 Onitis sulcipennis
 Onitis tanzaniensis
 Onitis thalassinus
 Onitis thoracicus
 Onitis tingaudi
 Onitis tortuosus
 Onitis trochantericus
 Onitis tumidus
 Onitis uncinatoides
 Onitis uncinatus
 Onitis unguiculatus
 Onitis upembanus
 Onitis vanderkelleni
 Onitis westermanni
 Onitis vicinus
 Onitis violaceus
 Onitis virens
 Onitis viridulus
 Onitis wittei
 Onitis vrydaghi

References

Scarabaeidae